Division 6 is the eight level in the league system of Swedish women's soccer.

Sources
Everysport, accessdate 29 October 2013

8
Summer association football leagues